The Wright Renown was a low entry single-decker bus body built on Volvo B10BLE chassis by Wrightbus in Ballymena, Northern Ireland.

Over 800 Renowns were built between 1997 and 2002, making it somewhat more successful than the B10L-based Liberator.

The Renown was replaced by the Eclipse (later Eclipse Metro) on Volvo B7L chassis, but due to unpopularity of the chassis, Wright developed the Eclipse Urban on Volvo B7RLE chassis, which became the true successor of the Renown.

External links

Low-entry buses
Renown
Vehicles introduced in 1997